Rav Baruch Mordechai Ezrachi (born March 27, 1929) is a prominent Hareidi rabbi, and a leader of the non-Hassidic Lithuanian Jews.
He is the Rosh Yeshiva of Ateres Yisrael in Bayit Vegan in Jerusalem, and a member of the Degel Hatorah Moetzas Gedolei Yisrael.

Rav Ezrachi's brother is Rav Yitzchok Ezrachi, a Rosh Yeshiva at the Mir Yeshiva in Jerusalem.
Rav Ezrachi is the son-in-law of the late Rabbi Meir Chodosh, mashgiach ruchani at the Hebron Yeshiva.

Works
Rav Ezrachi has written many volumes of commentary on Torah, Talmud, halacha, Jewish festivals, and thought, called Birkas Mordechai (Hebrew:  Blessings of Mordechai).

As per his Hebron Yeshiva heritage, Rav Ezrachi does not employ the Brisker method even though he considers himself a protégé of Rav Dovid Soloveitchik. Rather, he uses the more traditional methods of analysing and comparing Talmudic texts. This involves bringing up questions on the source which challenge the students' understanding to an uncomfortable degree, then resolving the issue by reinterpreting the text to a true understanding. During his lecture one day, he asked a particularly difficult question. When he saw the students were not so involved, he shouted, "Three in this room know the answer to this question!" The students looked around, not sure to whom among them he was referring. He continued, "HaShem, the Rambam, and me!" He then resolved the issue.

References

External links

Living people
Haredi rabbis in Israel
1929 births